
Year 375 BC was a year of the pre-Julian Roman calendar. At the time, it was known as the First year without Tribunate or Consulship (or, less frequently, year 379 Ab urbe condita). The denomination 375 BC for this year has been used since the early medieval period, when the Anno Domini calendar era became the prevalent method in Europe for naming years.

Events 
 By place 
 Greece 
 The Theban general, Pelopidas, is made the leader of the Sacred Band, a selected infantry body of 300.
 Learning that the Spartan garrison of Orchomenus (in Boeotia) is leaving for an expedition to Locris, Pelopidas sets out with the Sacred Band of Thebes and a small force of cavalry, intending to seize the city while it is unguarded. However, as the Thebans approach the city, they learn that a sizable force has been dispatched from Sparta to reinforce the garrison at Orchomenus and is approaching the city. Pelopidas retreats with his force, but before the Thebans can reach safety at Tegyra, they meet the original Spartan garrison returning from Locris. In the ensuing Battle of Tegyra, the Thebans rout the larger Spartan force.

 China 
 Zhou Lie Wang becomes King of the Zhou Dynasty of China.

Births 
 Cleitus the Black, Macedonian general of Alexander the Great (approximate date)
 Chanakya, ancient Indian teacher, author, strategist and royal advisor.

Deaths

References